Francesco Denanto (also referred to as Francesco de Nanto and Francesco de Nempto) was an Italian woodcutter of the Renaissance period.

He was born in Savoy, but worked in Rome in the 1520s. This is known as a result of two notarial acts signed by Denanto in Rome - one from 6 January 1524, and a later copy from the end of 1524 or early 1525.
There is no evidence, however, that he ever worked for Titian. 

One set of woodcuts completed by Denanto was a series on the life of Jesus. He obviously worked with Girolamo da Treviso whose name is indicated on two prints. Depaulis lists 21 actual prints by Francesco Denanto, of which impressions of 17 are kept in the British Museum. It is known that Ferdinand Columbus also owned some more prints by Denanto, which have not been preserved, save one or two. Michael Bury, in analysing the notarial acts signed by Denanto, has suggested that the artist may have completed at least 50 woodblocks before his arrival in Rome.

Notes

References

Thierry Depaulis, ‘From Savoy to Rome: De Nanto, a neglected printmaker of the early 16th century’, Print Quarterly, vol. XXXVII, no. 2 (June 2020), pp. 123–139.
 Michael Bury, 'Francesco de Nanto in Rome 1524-26: New Documents', Print Quarterly, vol. XXXVIII, no. 2 (June 2021), pp. 180-183. This includes an Appendix of Documents.

Attribution:
 

15th-century people from Savoy
Woodcut cutters
Year of death unknown
Year of birth unknown
Woodcut designers
Artists from Rome